Scott Leo Klug (born January 16, 1953) is an American lobbyist, author, and businessman, as well as a former politician and television reporter. From 1991-1999, he was a Republican member of the United States House of Representatives from Wisconsin, representing .

Early life, education and career
Klug grew up in West Allis and Wauwatosa, both Milwaukee-area suburbs. He attended  Marquette University High School, a Roman Catholic boys school, and then Lawrence University, graduating with a degree in history in 1975. The following  year he received a master's degree in journalism from Northwestern University. He later received an M.B.A. from the University of Wisconsin–Madison in 1990. For 14 years, Klug was a television journalist, serving as anchor and reporter for various stations in Seattle, Washington, Madison, Wisconsin, and Washington, D.C.

U.S. Congress
Klug was first elected to the 102nd Congress in 1990, defeating, in a surprise upset, 16 term incumbent Robert Kastenmeier, with 53% of the vote. He won re-election in 1992 with 63% of the vote, in 1994 with 69% of the vote, and in 1996 with 57% of the vote.

While in office, Klug was a member of the House Energy and Commerce Committee. In his first term, he gained national attention as one of the members of the Republican Gang of Seven. He also opposed the George H. W. Bush administration by supporting abortion rights and family leave.

While in Congress, Klug opposed the federal drinking age, saying alcohol regulation should be a matter left to individual states, and advocated the revocation of the 1984 National Minimum Drinking Age Act.

At the urging of Republican leadership under Newt Gingrich, Klug presented a resolution stating that the House would not support continuing resolutions to keep government funding; this led to the United States federal government shutdown of 1995 and 1996.

Klug did not run for re-election in 1998, and his term expired on January 3, 1999. His seat was won by Democrat Tammy Baldwin.

Post-Congressional career
Klug currently serves as director of public affairs for Foley & Lardner, a Wisconsin-based law firm, and represents clients 
in Washington and various state capitals.

In 2013, he authored The Alliance, a mystery novel about religion and antiquities.

In 2007, Klug co-chaired Rudy Giuliani's presidential campaign in Wisconsin along with former U.S. Sen. Bob Kasten and former State Sen. Cathy Stepp. On January 30, 2008, Giuliani dropped out of the race.

In August 1998, Klug, as head of Barking Sands Media, purchased Wisconsin Trails, a travel magazine. He was the CEO of Trails Media Group, based in Black Earth, Wisconsin, until 2007 when the company was sold to the Milwaukee Journal Sentinel and moved to Milwaukee, Wisconsin.

Personal life
Klug is a resident of Madison, Wisconsin with his wife, Theresa Summers Klug. The couple has three children.

References

External links
 
 

1953 births
Living people
American television reporters and correspondents
Politicians from Madison, Wisconsin
Politicians from Milwaukee
Medill School of Journalism alumni
Lawrence University alumni
Wisconsin School of Business alumni
Businesspeople from Madison, Wisconsin
Republican Party members of the United States House of Representatives from Wisconsin
Marquette University High School alumni
Catholics from Wisconsin
Members of Congress who became lobbyists